Gerhard Tintner (September 29, 1907 – November 13, 1983) was an American economist who worked most of his career in the United States. Tintner is known for his contributions during the formation years of econometrics as a discipline. In a festschrift in Tintner's honor, Karl A. Fox lauded Tintner as one of the "foremost econometricians of our time."

Born to Austrian parents in Nuremberg, Bavaria, Tintner studied economics, statistics, and law at the University of Vienna, where he received his doctor's degree in 1929. He was a staff member of the Austrian Institute of Economic Research in 1936, before leaving Austria for the United States, "as he was pessimistic regarding the future of Austria". He briefly worked as a Research Fellow at the Cowles Commission before joining faculty at Iowa State College, where he was promoted professor in 1946. In 1951 he was elected as a Fellow of the American Statistical Association.
He remained at Iowa State until 1962, when he resigned to join the staff of the University of Pittsburgh. In 1963, he accepted a position as Distinguished Professor of Economics and Mathematics at the University of Southern California. Returning to Austria in 1973, he accepted an appointment as Professor and Head (1973–1978) of the Institut für Ökonometrie at Vienna University of Technology, a position he held until retirement.

References

Further reading 
 

1907 births
1983 deaths
Austrian economists
Austrian emigrants to the United States
University of Vienna alumni
Iowa State University faculty
Fellows of the American Statistical Association
Fellows of the Econometric Society
Expatriates of Austria-Hungary in Germany